Gary Cameron Owen (born July 26, 1974) is an American stand-up comedian and actor. After being named "Funniest Serviceman in America", his big break came in 1997 on Black Entertainment Television's stand-up showcase Comic View. Owen followed this debut with featured roles in the films Daddy Day Care, Little Man, and College. He has cultivated a very large African-American following after headlining on cable channel BET and performing at targeted events, such as Shaquille O'Neal's All-Star Comedy Jam Tour. In 2016, he was in a TV show on BET called The Gary Owen Show.

Career
Prior to his successful career in stand-up comedy, Gary Owen served in the U.S. Navy for six years as a Master-at-Arms and was in the Presidential Honor Guard. After a year of doing stand-up, Owen was named "Funniest Serviceman in America". He continued doing stand-up in San Diego and developed a large African-American fan base. He went on to win the "Funniest Black Comedian in San Diego" contest. That led to his first gig at The Comedy Store in Hollywood. In July 1997, he auditioned for BET's Comic View. Two appearances on the multicultural comedy showcase won him his own one-hour Grandstand show. At the end of the season, he was selected from the year's four "Grandstanders" to be the host. Owen was the only white man to have ever hosted Comic View.

In April 2011, Ebony dubbed Owen "Black America's Favorite White Comic".
Owen has produced two stand-up DVDs: Breakin' Out The Park, which is now available nationwide, and Urban Legend. He was also one of the headliners on Martin Lawrence Presents: 1st Amendment Stand-Up on Starz.

Owen starred in the Screen Gems comedy Think Like a Man — based on Steve Harvey's book Act Like a Lady, Think Like a Man — with Kevin Hart and Gabrielle Union.

Owen has also appeared in such films as Rebound, College, Daddy Day Care and Highway, and had a recurring role on Tyler Perry's TBS show House of Payne as Zack. He appeared in the comedy "Meet the Blacks" as Larry. He has a TV show on BET called The Gary Owen Show.

He has released the comedy specials Gary Owen: True Story (2012) and Gary Owen: I Agree with Myself (2015), both directed by Leslie Small, as well as Gary Owen: #DoinWhatIDo (2019), directed by Brian Volk-Weiss.

Personal life
Owen was born in Cincinnati, Ohio. He grew up in a trailer park in Oxford along with his six siblings. Owen and his wife Kenya Duke were married in 2003. They have two children together, a son, Austin, and a daughter, Kennedy. Kenya has a son, Emilio, from a previous relationship. In late March 2021, Owen filed for divorce.

Filmography

Film

Television

References

External links 
 
 

1974 births
Living people
American male comedians
American male film actors
Male actors from Cincinnati
United States Navy sailors
Comedians from Ohio
20th-century American comedians
21st-century American comedians